Émilien is a French masculine given name and may refer to:
Émilien of Nantes (died c. 725), French religious leader canonized as a saint 
Émilien Allard (1915–1977), Canadian carillonneur, pianist, clarinetist, and composer
Émilien Amaury (1909-1977), French publishing magnate
Émilien-Benoît Bergès (born 1983), French road racing cyclist
Émilien Dumas (1804–1873), French scholar, paleontologist, and geologist
Émilien Jacquelin (born 1995), French biathlete
Émilien Lafrance (1911–1977), Canadian politician
Émilien Morissette (born 1927), Canadian politician 
Émilien de Nieuwerkerke (1811–1892), French sculptor 
Émilien Pelletier (born 1945), Canadian politician
Émilien Viennet (born 1992), French road and cyclo-cyclist  

French masculine given names